This is a list of player transfers involving RFU Championship teams before or during the 2020–21 season. The list is of deals that are confirmed and are either from or to a rugby union team in the Championship during the 2019–20 season. It is not unknown for confirmed deals to be cancelled at a later date. On 2 April 2020, Newcastle Falcons are automatically promoted back to Premiership Rugby to replace relegated Saracens under RFU's 'best record playing formula' and due to the COVID-19 pandemic. Leeds Tykes are relegated to National League 1 and are replaced by promoted Richmond for the 2020–21 season.

Ampthill

Players In
 Charlie Beckett from  Gloucester 
 James Flynn from  Leeds Tykes
 Jamie Jack from  Nottingham
 Llewelyn Jones from  Nottingham
 Alex Humfrey from  Leeds Tykes 
 Corey Lewis from  Cardiff Metropolitan University RFC  
 Matt Marsh from  Cardiff Metropolitan University RFC
 Joe Roberts from  Scarlets (short-term loan)
 Jeremy To'a from  Sale FC 
 Devante Onojaife from  Northampton Saints 
 Kieran Frost from  Rotherham Titans
 Tom Hudson from  Gloucester (season-long loan)

Players Out
 Maama Molitika retired
 Shay Kerry to  Jersey Reds
 Soane Tonga'uiha to  Chinnor
 Sam Hanks to  London Scottish
 Rob Langley to  Cambridge 
 Darryl Veenendaal to  Cambridge 
 Kwaku Asiedu to  London Scottish

Bedford Blues

Players In
 Elijah Niko from  Ealing Trailfinders 
 Andre Robson from  Leeds Tykes
 Corrie Barrett from  Munster
 Ewan Fenley from  Ealing Trailfinders (season-long loan)
 Oli Robinson from  Ealing Trailfinders (season-long loan)

Players Out
 Sam Leeming to  Jersey Reds
 Ryan Hutler to  Jersey Reds
 Will Hooley to  Saracens
 Dean Adamson to  Rouen
 Lewis Robling to  Blackheath
 Ed Taylor to  Blackheath 
 Joe Green to  Cambridge
 Josh Buggea to  Nottingham
 Robbie Smith to  Newcastle Falcons
 Grayson Hart released
 Dan Temm released

Cornish Pirates

Players In
 Josh Caulfield from  Exeter Chiefs
 James McRae from  Exeter Chiefs
 Harry Bazalgette from  Exeter University
 Luke Scully from  Cardiff Blues (season-long loan)
 Arwel Robson from  Dragons (loan)

Players Out
 Will Norton to  Plymouth Albion
 Matt Evans retired
 Brett Beukeboom retired
 Ruaridh Dawson released
 Cian Romaine released
 Jack Clemson to  Plymouth Albion 
 Kyle Moyle to  Gloucester
 Marlen Walker to  Wasps (short-term loan)
 Alex Schwarz to  Wasps (short-term loan)
 Javier Rojas Alvarez released
 Suva Ma'asi to  Coventry  
 Jay Tyack to  Worcester Warriors

Coventry

Players In
 Toby Trinder from  Northampton Saints
 Rob Stevenson from  London Scottish
 Alex Gibson from  Hartpury University 
 Keston Lines from  Leicester Tigers
 Kalius Hutchinson promoted from Academy  
 James Martin promoted from Academy
 Sam McNulty promoted from Academy
 Tom Emery from  England Sevens 
 Josh Barton from  London Scottish
 Nic Dolly from  Sale Sharks
 Suva Ma'asi from  Cornish Pirates

Players Out
 Heath Stevens retired
 James Gibbons to  Ealing Trailfinders
 Will Flinn to  Hartpury University
 Scott Russell to  Hartpury University
 David Halaifonua to  London Scottish
 Ben Adams to  Cambridge
 Darren Dawidiuk released
 Gerard Ellis released
 David Langley to  Birmingham Moseley
 Scott Tolmie released
 Luke Wallace to  Leicester Tigers
 Gareth Denman to  Doncaster Knights
 Tom Kessell to  Bristol Bears
 Jack Ram to  New England Free Jacks
 Max Titchener to  Chinnor 
 Rory Jennings to  Clermont 
 James Voss to  Mont-de-Marsan 
 Jake Byrne to  Richmond  
 George Oram to  Richmond
 Max Trimble to  Richmond
 Nic Dolly to  Leicester Tigers

Doncaster Knights

Players In
 James Kane from  NSW Country Eagles
 Mark Best from  Jersey Reds
 James Mitchell from  Northampton Saints
 Conor Joyce from  Jersey Reds
 Tom Hill from  Nottingham
 Sam Graham from  Bristol Bears 
 Billy McBryde from  RGC 1404 
 James Newey from  Jersey Reds
 Jack Davies from  Bath
 Joe Jones from  Sale Sharks
 George Roberts from  RGC 1404
 Jack Spittle from  Nottingham
 Jack Rouse from  Ealing Trailfinders (season-long loan)
 John Kelly from  Plymouth Albion
 Gareth Denman from  Coventry
 Harry Strong from  Nottingham
 Tom Bacon from  Wasps (season-long loan)
 Will Britton from  Bath
 Guido Volpi from  Ospreys (season-long loan) 
 Jerry Sexton from  Southern Kings 
 Connor Edwards from  Dragons (season-long loan)

Players Out
 Tom James to  Northampton Saints
 George Edgson to  Jersey Reds
 Jack Roberts to  Jersey Reds
 Morgan Eames to  Beziers
 Wian Conradie to  Dallas Jackals
 Pete Lucock to  Newcastle Falcons
 Curtis Wilson to  Nottingham 
 Tom Calladine to  Sheffield Tigers 
 Cameron Cowell released
 Lloyd Hayes released
 Tom Hicks retired
 Michael Hills retired
 Penikolo Latu released
 Steve McColl released
 Rory Pitman released
 Dan Suter released
 Tom Hill released 
 Colin Quigley to  Rotherham Titans 
 Fotu Lokotui to  Glasgow Warriors
 Kurt Morath to  Austin Gilgronis
 Tyson Lewis retired

Ealing Trailfinders

Players In
 Angus Kernohan from  Ulster
 Max Bodilly from  Exeter Chiefs
 Simon Linsell from  Gloucester
 Will Davis from  Northampton Saints
 Luke Daniels from  Bristol Bears
 Barney Maddison from  London Irish
 James Gibbons from  Coventry
 Michael van Vuuren from  Northampton Saints
 Lewis Thiede from  Bristol Bears
 Shaun Malton from  Bristol Bears
 Simon Uzokwe from  Newcastle Falcons
 Guy Thompson from  Leicester Tigers
 Dean Hammond from  Worcester Warriors
 Charlie Walker from  Zebre
 Fraser Strachan from  Northampton Saints
 Harry Dugmore promoted from Academy
 Elliot Chilvers promoted from Academy
 Kyle Whyte from  London Scottish
 Levi Davis from  Bath
 Abongile Nonkontwana from  Bulls 
 Bobby de Wee from  Southern Kings 
 Johannes Jonker from  Lions
 Robert Beattie from  London Scottish
 Matt Gordon from  Edinburgh
 Bill Johnston from  Ulster (short-term loan)
 Malon Al-Jiboori from  San Diego Legion
 Max Northcote-Green from  Exeter Chiefs (short-term deal)

Players Out
 Jordy Reid to  Gloucester
 Pete Lydon to  Rouen
 Tom Crozier released
 Sam Dickinson released
 Chester Duff released
 Paul Grant released
 Reon Joseph retired
 Andrew Durutalo to  Seattle Seawolves
 Harry Sloan to  Saracens
 Jake Ellwood to  London Scottish
 Alex Lundberg retired
 Jack Rouse to  Doncaster Knights (season-long loan)
 Harrison Obatoyinbo to  Toulon
 Jordan Els to  Harlequins
 Craig Trenier to  Harlequins
 Lewis Jones to  Rosslyn Park
 Seb Stegmann to  Rosslyn Park
 Matt Cornish to  London Irish
 Ryan Roach to  Birmingham Moseley 
 Tommy Bell to  Asia Pacific Dragons 
 Elijah Niko to  Bedford Blues
 Ewan Fenley to  Bedford Blues (season-long loan)
 Oli Robinson to  Bedford Blues (season-long loan)
 Ben Betts to  Nottingham

Hartpury University

Players In
 Shaun Knight from  Rouen
 Ehize Ehizode from  Chinnor
 Will Flinn from  Coventry
 Ben Foley from  Nottingham
 Cameron Holenstein from  Old Elthamians
 Dale Lemon from  Cinderford
 Wil Partington from  London Irish
 Scott Russell from  Coventry
 Luke Stratford from  Clifton
 Aled Ward from  Cardiff Metropolitan University
 Calum Waters from  University of Bristol
 James Williams from  Sale Sharks
 Nick Selway from  London Scottish

Players Out
 Rupert Harden retired
 Jake Henry to  Havre
 Tom Jubb retired
 Elias Caven to  Ayr
 Harry Cochrane released
 Mike Flook released
 Joe Margetts to  Ayr
 Des Merrey released
 Jack Preece to  Cinderford
 Will Tanner released
 Mike Wilcox to  Cinderford
 Luke Carter to  London Scottish
 Matt Gilbert to  Cinderford
 Akapusi Qera to  Newport
 Alex Gibson to  Coventry

Jersey Reds

Players In
 Ollie Dawe from  Bristol Bears
 Jack Higgins from  Plymouth Albion
 Ciaran Parker from  Munster
 George Edgson from  Doncaster Knights
 Zak Farrance from  Oyonnax
 Shay Kerry from  Ampthill
 Seán O'Connor from  Munster
 Lewis Wynne from  London Scottish
 Michael Dowsett from  Canon Eagles
 James Elliott from  Leeds Tykes
 Sam Leeming from  Bedford Blues
 Kurt Heatherley from  Auckland
 Ryan Hutler from  Bedford Blues
 Lesley Klim from  Ospreys
 Jack Roberts from  Doncaster Knights
 Harry Doolan from  Jersey Athletic
 Macauley Cook from  Cardiff Blues
 Dan Barnes from  London Scottish
 Tim Grey from  RGC 1404 
 Cameron Nordli-Kelemeti from  Newcastle Falcons (season-long loan)
 Bader Pretorius from  Southern Kings 
 Scott van Breda from  Worcester Warriors (short-term loan)
 Darren Atkins from  Bath (season-long loan)
 Max Green from  Bath (season-long loan)
 Eoghan Clarke from  Munster
 Adam Nicol from  Glasgow Warriors
 James Scott from  Worcester Warriors (season-long loan)

Players Out
 Aaron Penberthy retired
 Lee Roy Atalifo to  Edinburgh
 Leroy Van Dam to  Aurillac
 George Wilmott released
 Mark Best to  Doncaster Knights
 Conor Joyce to  Doncaster Knights
 Augustin Slowik to  Nice
 James Newey to  Doncaster Knights
 Jack Stapley to  Nottingham
 Harry Morley to  London Scottish
 Liam Howley to  Southland 
 Alec Clarey to  Saracens
 Janco Venter to  Saracens
 Rodney Iona to  Gordon 
 Will Homer to  Scarlets 
 James Wayland released
 Greg Dyer to  Southland 
 Liam Hallam-Eames to  Auckland
 Jake Upfield to  Bond University
 Luc Jones to  Richmond
 Kyle Hatherell to  Worcester Warriors

London Scottish

Players In
 Toby Freeman from  Harlequins
 Luke Carter from  Hartpury University
 Brian Tuilagi from  Mogliano
 Fred Tuilagi from  Colorno
 Jake Ellwood from  Ealing Trailfinders
 Harry Morley from  Jersey Reds
 Curtis Reynolds from  Pontypridd
 James Tyas from  Chinnor
 David Halaifonua from  Coventry
 Joe Rees from  Chinnor
 Nick Selway from  Chinnor
 Laurence May from  Chinnor
 Sam Hanks from  Ampthill
 Sam Yawayawa from  Cambridge
 Ryan Crowley from  British Army
 Josh Daventanivalu from  British Army  
 Jack Parfitt from  Hong Kong Scottish (season-long loan)
 Noah Ferdinand from  Tonbridge Juddians 
 Cameron McDonald from  Clifton
 Mike McDonald from  British Army
 Tom Petty from  Bishop's Stortford
 Kwaku Asiedu from  Ampthill
 Jason Worrall from  Chinnor
 Ben Manning from  Chinnor

Players Out
 Matt Gordon to  Edinburgh
 Lewis Wynne to  Jersey Reds
 Matas Jurevicius to  Harlequins
 Elliott Creed to  Birmingham Moseley
 Luke Hibberd to  Birmingham Moseley
 Dan Barnes to  Jersey Reds
 Kyle Whyte to  Ealing Trailfinders
 Rob Stevenson to  Coventry
 James Malcolm to  Dallas Jackals
 Dean Squire to  Hong Kong Scottish (season-long loan)
 Robert Beattie to  Ealing Trailfinders
 Nick Selway to  Hartpury University
 Josh Barton to  Coventry
 Ben Christie to  Richmond
 Jonny Harris to  Richmond
 Luke Frost to  Nottingham

Nottingham

Players In
 Jack Stapley from  Jersey Reds
 Carl Kirwan from  Chinnor
 Owen Hills from  Leicester Tigers
 Toby Williams from  Rotherham Titans
 Matt Riddington from  Nottingham Trent University
 Charlie Thacker unattached
 Willie Ryan from  Chinnor
 Jack Ramshaw from  Chinnor
 Josh Buggea from  Bedford Blues
 Sam Hollingsworth from  Rotherham Titans
 Michael Stronge from  Ballymena
 Curtis Wilson from  Doncaster Knights
 Ben Betts from  Ealing Trailfinders
 Luke Frost from  London Scottish
 Ben Sugars from  Leeds Tykes
 Shaun Evans to  Scarlets (season-long loan)
 Harri O'Connor from  Scarlets (season-long loan)
 Jac Price to  Scarlets (season-long loan)

Players Out
 Oliver Chessum to  Leicester Tigers
 Shane O'Leary to  Rouen
 Ben Foley to  Hartpury University
 Tom Hill to  Doncaster Knights
 Jack Spittle to  Doncaster Knights
 Harry Strong to  Doncaster Knights
 Luke Peters to  Blackheath 
 Billy Walker to  Cambridge 
 James Connolly to  Carcassonne 
 Ben Brownlie to  Cambridge 
 David Williams to  Leicester Tigers (season-long loan) 
 Oisín Heffernan to  Northampton Saints 
 Jamie Jack to  Ampthill
 Llewelyn Jones to  Ampthill

Richmond

Players In
 Hamish Barton from  Old Elthamians
 Jake Byrne from  Coventry
 Ben Christie from  London Scottish
 Sam Collingridge from  London Irish
 Chris Elder from  Chinnor
 Alex Goble from  Old Elthamians
 Jonny Harris from  London Scottish
 Fred Hosking from  Old Elthamians
 Luc Jones from  Jersey Reds
 Will Kaye from  Loughborough Students RUFC
 Ted Landray from  Old Elthamians
 George Oram from  Coventry
 Callum Watson from  Chinnor
 Max Trimble from  Coventry

Players Out
 Jamie Gibbs retired
 Harry Edwards retired

Saracens

Players In
 Joel Kpoku promoted from Academy
 Aled Davies from  Ospreys
 Callum Hunter-Hill from  Edinburgh
 Tim Swinson from  Glasgow Warriors
 Will Hooley from  Bedford Blues
 Harry Sloan from  Ealing Trailfinders
 Sean Reffell promoted from Academy
 Alec Clarey from  Jersey Reds
 Janco Venter from  Jersey Reds
 Manu Vunipola promoted from Academy
 Juan Pablo Socino from  El Salvador
 Andy Christie promoted from Academy
 Elliott Obatoyinbo promoted from Academy
 Kapeli Pifeleti promoted from Academy
 Ethan Lewis from  Cardiff Blues (season-long loan)
 Toby Salmon from  Newcastle Falcons (season-long loan)
 Alex Goode returned from  NEC Green Rockets

Players Out
 Matt Gallagher to  Munster
 Titi Lamositele to  Montpellier
 Ben Earl to  Bristol Bears (season-long loan)
 Max Malins to  Bristol Bears (season-long loan)
 Jack Singleton to  Gloucester 
 Joe Gray to  Harlequins
 George Kruis to  Panasonic Wild Knights
 Nick Isiekwe to  Northampton Saints (season-long loan)
 Ben Spencer to  Bath
 Alex Lozowski to  Montpellier (season-long loan)
 Will Skelton to  La Rochelle
 Nick Tompkins to  Dragons (season-long loan)
 Brad Barritt retired
 Rhys Carré to  Cardiff Blues
 Viliami Hakalo retired
 Alex Goode to  NEC Green Rockets (season-long loan)
 Tobias Munday released
 Richard Wigglesworth to  Leicester Tigers 
 Juan Figallo retired

See also
List of 2020–21 Premiership Rugby transfers
List of 2020–21 Pro14 transfers
List of 2020–21 Super Rugby transfers
List of 2020–21 Top 14 transfers
List of 2020–21 Major League Rugby transfers

References

2020-21
2020–21 RFU Championship